This timeline of Carboniferous research is a chronological listing of events in the history of geology and paleontology focused on the study of earth during the span of time lasting from 358.9 to 298.9 million years ago and the legacies of this period in the rock and fossil records.

19th century

1828

 Brongn. described the new genus Calamites.

1853
 Meyer described the new genus Arthropleura.

1860
 Dawson described the new genus Hylonomus.

1882
 Cope described the new genus Edaphosaurus.

1887
 Cope described the new genus Eryops.

1889
 Newberry described the new genus Stethacanthus.

1899
 Karpinsky described the new genus Helicoprion.

20th century
 Jeram described the new genus Pulmonoscorpius.

See also

 History of paleontology
 Timeline of paleontology
 Timeline of Cambrian research
 Timeline of Ordovician research
 Timeline of Silurian research
 Timeline of Devonian research
 Timeline of Permian research

References

Carboniferous
Carboniferous